The Humboldt Mountains may refer to one of several mountain ranges:

Humboldt Mountains (Antarctica), in Queen Maud Land
Humboldt Mountains (New Zealand), in Otago, South Island
Humboldt Range, in Nevada, United States
East Humboldt Range, Nevada
West Humboldt Range, Nevada